This is a list of Norwegian artists listed by medium.

Music Artists

 A-ha
 Morten Harket
 Sigrid (singer)
 Aurora (singer)
 Girl in Red
 Anna of the North
 Dagny (singer)
 Highasakite
 Sissel Kyrkjebø
 Fieh
 Susanne Sundfør
 Röyksopp
 Oslo Gospel Choir
 Edvard Grieg
  (born 1997), DJ, record producer
 Kygo (born 1991), DJ
 Ina Wroldsen
 Lene Nystrøm of Danish - Norwegian band Aqua (band)
 Astrid S
 Bertine Zetlitz
 Martin Tungevaag (born 1993), DJ
 Lene Marlin
 Maria Mena
 Angelina Jordan
 Margaret Berger
 Matoma
 Jaga Jazzist
 Leif Ove Andsnes
 Dimmu Borgir
 Darkthrone
 Enslaved
 Satyricon
 Kurt Nilsen
 Maria Arredondo
 Christian Ingebrigtsen
 Espen Lind
 Mari Boine
 M2M (band)
 Marit Larsen
 Marion Raven
 Karoline Krüger
 Donkeyboy
 Turbonegro
 Ingrid Olava
 Ingebjørg Bratland
 Maria Solheim
 Lisa Stokke

Painters

 Peder Aadnes (1739–1792), painter
 Martin Aagaard (1863–1913), painter
 Rolf Aamot (born 1934), painter, film director, photographer and tonal-image composer
 Alf-Jørgen Aas (1915–1981), painter
 Betzy Akersloot-Berg (1850–1922), painter
 Peter Nicolai Arbo (1831–1892), painter, who specialized in painting historical motifs and images from Norse mythology
 Dina Aschehoug (1861–1956), painter
 Nikolai Astrup (1880–1928), painter
 Kjell Aukrust (1920–2002), author, poet, artist
 Marianne Aulie (born 1971), artist
 Harriet Backer (1845–1932), painter
 Peder Balke (1804–1887), landscape painter
 Tupsy Clement (1871–1959), landscape painter
 Hans Dahl (1849–1937), painter of landscapes and genre works
 Nirmal Singh Dhunsi (born 1960), painter
 Johan Christian Dahl (1788–1857), landscape painter
 Andreas Edvard Disen (1845–1923), landscape painter
 Ludvig Eikaas (1920–2010), painter and graphic designer
 Axel Ender (1853–1920), painter and sculptor
 Thorvald Erichsen (1868–1939), painter
 Bjarne Eriksen (1882–1970), painter, brother of Sigurd
 Sigurd Eriksen (1884–1976), painter, brother of Bjarne
 Liv Kristine Espenæs (born 1977), painter, singer
 Thomas Fearnley (1802–1842), romanticist landscape painter
 Kai Fjell (1907–1989), painter, printmaker and scenographer
 Johannes Flintoe (1787–1870), painter, known for his depiction of Norwegian landscapes, and scenes from Danish and Scandinavian history
 Paul René Gauguin (1911–1976), painter and graphic designer, grandson of Paul Gauguin
 Rolf Groven (born 1943), painter, known for his satirical art painted in figurative style
 Hans Gude (1825–1903), romanticist painter of landscapes
 Håkon Gullvåg (born 1959), painter of portraits
 DOT DOT DOT (artist) (born Oslo, Norway), visual, public and conceptual artist
 Carl von Hanno (1901–1953), painter, especially of seascapes
 Aasta Hansteen (1824–1908), painter, writer, and early feminist
 Karl Erik Harr (born 1940), painter, illustrator, graphic artist and author
 Jean Heiberg (1884–1976), painter and sculptor
 Thorvald Hellesen (1888–1937), painter and designer
 Lars Hertervig (1830–1902), painter
 Kristen Holbø (1869–1953), painter and illustrator
 Thorolf Holmboe (1866–1935), painter, illustrator, and designer
 Håvard Homstvedt (born 1976), painter
 Olaf Isaachsen (1835–1893), painter
 Lars Jorde (1865–1939), painter
 Theodor Kittelsen (1857–1914), painter especially of nature scenes and illustrations of fairy tales and legends
 Konrad Knudsen (1890–1959), painter, journalist, and parliamentarian
 Anne Krafft (born 1957), painter and photographer
 Christian Krohg (1852–1925), naturalist painter, illustrator, author and journalist
 Oda Krohg (1860–1935), painter
 Olaf Lange (1875–1965), painter and graphic designer
 Vincent Stoltenberg Lerche (1837–1892), painter and illustrator
 Dagny Tande Lid (1903–1998), painter and illustrator
 Jonas Lie (1880–1940), painter of the sea, channels, and ships
 Bjørg Lødøen (1931–2009), painter, graphics artist, and composer
 Ingrid Lønningdal (born 1981), contemporary artist
 Camilla Løw (born 1976), artist
 Charles Lundh (1856–1908), joined the Skagen Painters in 1883 and 1888
 Edvard Munch (1863–1944), Symbolist painter, printmaker, and a forerunner of expressionistic art
 Odd Nerdrum (born 1944), figurative painter
 Rolf Nesch (1893–1975), expressionist painter and printmaker
 Kjell Nupen (1955–2014), painter and sculptor, known for his use of a particular shade of blue
 Wilhelm Peters (1851–1935), painter, participated in the Modern Breakthrough, one of the Skagen Painters               
 Frederik Petersen (1759–1825), portrait painter
 Vebjørn Sand (born 1966), painter and artist
 Christiane Schreiber (1822–1898), portrait painter
 Otto Sinding (1842–1909), painter
 Ludvig Skramstad (1855–1912), landscape painter
 Christian Skredsvig (1854–1924), painter and writer
 Harald Sohlberg (1869–1935), neo-romantic painter especially of mountains of Rondane and the town of Røros
 Halvard Storm (1877–1964), 20th century artist/etcher of Norwegian landscapes, towns, and architecture
 Petar Tale (born 1947), painter
 Frits Thaulow (1847–1906), impressionist painter
 Adolph Tidemand (1814–1876), painter
 Bernt Tunold (1877–1946), landscape painter
 Emanuel Vigeland (1875–1948), artist of frescoes, stained glass and sculptures
 Gustav Rudolf Undersaker (1887–1972), painter, impressionist,
 Erik Werenskiold (1855–1938), painter and illustrator
 Oscar Wergeland (1844–1910) historical painter
 Herman Willoch (1892–1968), painter of frescoes
 Oluf Wold-Torne (1867–1919), painter

Sculptors

 Nils Aas (1933–2004), sculptor and medalist, student of Per Palle Storm
 Guri Berg (born 1963), sculptor and artist
 Brynjulf Bergslien (1830–1898), sculptor
 Kari Buen (born 1938), sculptor
 Sæbjørn Buttedahl (1876–1960), sculptor
 Kristian Kvakland (1927–2011), sculptor and artist
 Carl Nesjar (1920–2015), sculptor, painter and graphic designer
 Louise Nippierd (born 1962), body sculptor and metalwork artist
 Kjell Erik Killi Olsen (born 1952), painter and sculptor
 Stephan Sinding (1846–1922), Norwegian-Danish sculptor
 Knut Steen (1924–2011), sculptor
 Per Palle Storm (1910–1994), naturalistic sculptor, Nils Aas' teacher
 Per Ung (1933–2013), sculptor and graphic designer
 Gustav Vigeland (1869–1943), sculptor
 Dyre Vaa (1903–1980), painter and sculptor

Photographers

 Knut Bry (born 1946), photographer and author
 Cecilie Dahl (born 1960), photographer and installation artist
 Sverre M. Fjelstad (born 1930), nature photographer
 Per Heimly (born 1972), photographer and editor
 Morten Krogvold (born 1950), portrait photographer
 Anders Beer Wilse (1865–1949), photographer
 Ann Lislegaard (born 1962), installations, animations, moving image, sound, light

Textile artists
Synnøve Anker Aurdal (1908–2000), textile artist
Ulrikke Greve (1868–1951), tapestry artist
Frida Hansen (1855–1931), art nouveau textile artist
Else Marie Jakobsen (1927–2012), textile artist and designer¨
Else Poulsson (1909–2002), painter and textile artist
Hannah Ryggen (1894–1970), Swedish-born Norwegian textile artist

Cartoonists

 Kaare Bratung (1906–1985), comic strip creator
 Mads Eriksen (born 1977), cartoonist for the comic strips M and Gnom
 Karine Haaland (born 1966), comic strip creator, animator and illustrator, of the comic strip Piray
 Jason (born 1965), cartoonist of anthropomorphic animal characters
 Lise Myhre (born 1975), cartoonist of Nemi
 Christopher Nielsen (born 1963), comics artist especially of subcultural depictions
 Knut Nærum (born 1961), comedian, author, comics writer and TV-entertainer
 Frode Øverli (born 1968), comic strip cartoonist

Architects

 Jon Jerde (1940–2015), American architect of Norwegian descent

References

Norwegian artists

Artists